is a Japanese politician of the Democratic Party of Japan, a member of the House of Representatives in the Diet (national legislature). A native of Tokyo, he attended Chuo University as an undergraduate and received his Ph.D in political science from Tokai University. After teaching at Hirosaki University, he ran unsuccessfully for the governorship of Aomori Prefecture, once in January 2003 and again in June of the same year. He also ran unsuccessfully for the House of Representatives in November 2003. In 2005, he was elected to the House of Representatives for the first time.

References

External links
 Official website in Japanese.

Living people
1963 births
Chuo University alumni
Tokai University alumni
Democratic Party of Japan politicians
Members of the House of Representatives (Japan)
21st-century Japanese politicians